North Carolina Highway 4 (NC 4) is a primary state highway in the U.S. state of North Carolina. Running near the Virginia state line in Nash and Halifax Counties, NC 4 connects the region with I-95.

Route description
The southern terminus of NC 4 is at US 301 near Rocky Mount. After heading west, NC 4 joins NC 48 near I-95 with exit/entrance ramps (exit 145); numerous hotels can be found here, built especially for I-95 travelers. After several miles, the road splits off and heads north for about  before entering Littleton and ending at US 158/NC 903 downtown.

NC 4 is one of the more rural roads in this part of the state; before entering Littleton, there are no incorporated towns along the route. This section of the state is mainly farmland.

History
As North Carolina renumbered its state highways in 1934, NC 4 was commissioned as a short state highway, running only a few miles from US 158 to the community of Airlie, just south of Littleton. When NC 48 running from Airlie to Littleton is rerouted to the east in 1951, NC 4 was left to take its place. In 1984 NC 4 was extended southward, taking over parts of NC 561, NC 48, and the decommissioned I-95 Business to US 301. I-95 Business was intended to take traffic from US 301 to I-95, and NC 4 took over that role.

Major intersections

References

External links

004
Transportation in Nash County, North Carolina
Transportation in Halifax County, North Carolina
Transportation in Warren County, North Carolina